Jamanak (Armenian: Ժամանակ, meaning "time") is the longest continuously running Armenian language daily newspaper in the world. It is published in Istanbul, Turkey.

History
The first issue appeared on October 28, 1908 with Misak Koçunyan as the editor and has been somewhat a family establishment, for it has been owned by the Koçunyan family since its inception. After Misak Koçounyan, it was passed down to Sarkis Koçunyan, and since 1992 to Ara Koçunyan.

Many illustrious names in Armenian literature have been contributors to the paper, including Krikor Zohrab, Daniel Varujan, Vahan Tekeyan, Yerukhan, Gomidas, Hovhannes Tumanyan, Teotig, Arshaguhi Teotig, Ruben Sevak, Zabel Yesayan, Sibil, Nigoghos Sarafian, Vazken Shushanyan, Zareh Vorpuni, Nshan Beshiktashlian, Hagop Mntsuri, Msho Kegham, Zahrad, Zaven Biberyan, Toros Azadyan, Minas Tölelyan, among others.

The newspaper uses the Western Armenian language and traditional Mesrobian spelling.

The editorial offices are located in Beyoğlu, Istanbul, Turkey.

See also 
 Media of Armenia

References

Links
 Jamanak Daily

Newspapers published in Istanbul
Newspapers established in 1908
Armenian-language newspapers
1908 establishments in the Ottoman Empire
Daily newspapers published in Turkey